Opanayake Nimal Piyatissa (born 5 January 1968) is a Sri Lankan politician, former provincial minister and Member of Parliament.

Piyatissa was born on 5 January 1968. He was previously a member of the Janatha Vimukthi Peramuna but is currently a member of the National Freedom Front.

Piyatissa was a member of Walapane Divisional Council and the Central Provincial Council where he held a provincial ministerial portfolio. He contested the 2020 parliamentary election as a Sri Lanka People's Freedom Alliance electoral alliance candidate in Nuwara Eliya District and was elected to the Parliament of Sri Lanka.

References

1968 births
Agriculture ministers of Sri Lankan provinces
Janatha Vimukthi Peramuna politicians
Jathika Nidahas Peramuna politicians
Local authority councillors of Sri Lanka
Living people
Members of the 16th Parliament of Sri Lanka
Members of the Central Province Board of Ministers
Sinhalese politicians
Sri Lankan Buddhists
Sri Lanka People's Freedom Alliance politicians
United People's Freedom Alliance politicians